In enzymology, a protein-Npi-phosphohistidine-sugar phosphotransferase is an enzyme that catalyzes the chemical reaction

protein Npi-phospho-L-histidine + sugar  protein histidine + sugar phosphate

Thus, the two substrates of this enzyme are protein Npi-phospho-L-histidine and sugar, whereas its two products are protein histidine and sugar phosphate.

This enzyme belongs to the family of transferases, specifically those transferring phosphorus-containing groups (phosphotransferases) with an alcohol group as acceptor.  The systematic name of this enzyme class is protein-Npi-phosphohistidine:sugar Npi-phosphotransferase. Other names in common use include glucose permease, PTS permease, phosphotransferase, phosphohistidinoprotein-hexose, enzyme IIl4ac, gene glC proteins, gene bglC RNA formation factors, PEP-dependent phosphotransferase enzyme II, PEP-sugar phosphotransferase enzyme II, phosphoenolpyruvate-sugar phosphotransferase enzyme II, phosphohistidinoprotein-hexose phosphotransferase, phosphohistidinoprotein-hexose phosphoribosyltransferase, phosphoprotein factor-hexose phosophotransferase, protein, specific or class, gene bglC, ribonucleic acid formation factor, gene glC, sucrose phosphotransferase system II, and protein-Npi-phosphohistidine:sugar N-pros-phosphotransferase.  This enzyme participates in 7 metabolic pathways: glycolysis / gluconeogenesis, fructose and mannose metabolism, galactose metabolism, ascorbate and aldarate metabolism, starch and sucrose metabolism, aminosugars metabolism, and phosphotransferase system (pts).

Structural studies

References

 
 

EC 2.7.1
Enzymes of known structure